Airaphilus is a genus of beetles in the family Silvanidae, containing the following species:

 Airaphilus calabricus Obenberger
 Airaphilus carpetanus Heyden
 Airaphilus chotanicus Semen.
 Airaphilus corsicus Grouvelle
 Airaphilus depressus Reitter
 Airaphilus elongatus Gyllenhal
 Airaphilus fallax Grouvelle
 Airaphilus ferrugineus Kraatz
 Airaphilus filiformis Reitter
 Airaphilus grouvellei Reitter
 Airaphilus hellenicus Obenberger
 Airaphilus hirtulus Reitter
 Airaphilus kaszabi Ratti
 Airaphilus madagascariensis Grouvelle
 Airaphilus martini Grouvelle
 Airaphilus montisatri Peyerimhoff
 Airaphilus nasutus Chevrolat
 Airaphilus natavidadei Peyerimhoff
 Airaphilus nubigena Wollaston
 Airaphilus paganettii Obenberger
 Airaphilus perangustus 
 Airaphilus raffrayi Grouvelle
 Airaphilus seabrai Luna de Carvalho
 Airaphilus semenowi Reitter
 Airaphilus seminiger Grouvelle
 Airaphilus serricollis Reitter
 Airaphilus siculus Reitter
 Airaphilus simoni Grouvelle
 Airaphilus subferrugineus Reitter
 Airaphilus syriacus Grouvelle
 Airaphilus vaulogeri Grouvelle

References

Silvanidae genera
Beetles of Europe
Beetles of Africa